Shane McAnally is the self-titled debut studio album by American country music singer Shane McAnally. It was also the only album of his career, released on October 24, 2000 via Curb Records. The album includes the singles "Say Anything," "Are Your Eyes Still Blue," and "Run Away".

Critical reception
Dan McIntosh of Country Standard Time gave the album a mixed review, criticizing McAnally's "average" voice and the "routine-sounding production" while praising McAnally's "original and witty ideas". He also praised "Are Your Eyes Still Blue" as a "sort of modern day bluegrass plucker." A review from Billboard was mixed, stating that the album "alternates between '70s -era pop/schlock and endearing contemporary country". The review praised "It Comes and Goes" and "You Ain't Seen Nothing Yet" and praised McAnally's "appealing" voice, but felt that some of the songs had weak lyrics.

Track listing

Personnel

 Richard Bennett – acoustic guitar
 Jim Brown – piano, organ
 Penny Cardin – background vocals
 Chad Cromwell – drums
 Rusty Danmyer – steel guitar, lap steel guitar
 Chip Davis – background vocals
 Dan Dugmore – acoustic guitar, steel guitar
 John Foster – background vocals
 Larry Franklin – fiddle
 Paul Franklin – steel guitar
 Michael Gregory – electric guitar
 Chris Griffin – loops
 Lori D. Hall – background vocals
 John Hammond – drums
 Tony Harrell – piano, keyboards, organ, Wurlitzer
 Rich Herring – acoustic guitar, electric guitar, gut string guitar, "lap loop", background vocals
 Dann Huff – electric guitar
 Andy Hull – drums
 David Hungate – bass guitar
 Kim Keyes – background vocals
 Tim Lauer – organ, keyboards
 B. James Lowry – acoustic guitar, electric guitar
 Mark Luna – background vocals
 Michael Lusk – background vocals
 Mac McAnally – acoustic guitar
 Greg Morrow – drums
 Duncan Mullins – bass guitar
 Steve Nathan – piano
 Marcia Ramierz – background vocals
 Michael Rhodes – bass guitar
 Ryan Ricks – percussion, background vocals
 Brent Rowan – electric guitar
 Sunny Russ – background vocals
 John Wesley Ryles – background vocals
 Brian D. Siewert – keyboards, piano, strings
 Stephony Smith – background vocals
 Steuart Smith – electric guitar
 Wanda Vick – fiddle, mandolin
 Mel Watts – drums, percussion
 Glenn Worf – bass guitar
 Andrea Zonn – fiddle

All tracks produced by Rich Herring; tracks 2 and 4 co-produced by Mark Bright; tracks 6, 8, 10–12 co-produced by Brian Ahern.

Singles

References

2000 debut albums
Shane McAnally albums
Curb Records albums